Evelyn is a 2002 Irish drama film, loosely based on the true story of Desmond Doyle and his fight in the Irish courts (December 1955) to be reunited with his children. The film stars Sophie Vavasseur in the title role, Pierce Brosnan as her father and Aidan Quinn, Julianna Margulies, Stephen Rea, and Alan Bates as supporters to Doyle's case. The film had a limited release in the United States, starting on December 13, 2002 and was later followed by the United Kingdom release on March 21, 2003.

The film was produced by Brosnan's own production company, Irish DreamTime, and others. It opened to positive reviews.

Plot
Nine-year-old Evelyn Doyle (Sophie Vavasseur) and her two brothers, Maurice (Hugh MacDonagh) and Dermot (Niall Beagan) are left motherless when their mother leaves their drunkard, out-of-work father Desmond Doyle (Pierce Brosnan). When Desmond's mother-in-law (Claire Mullan) reports the situation to the authorities, a judge decrees that the children are prohibited by law from being left in a broken home; they are placed in Church-run orphanages.

Evelyn's grandfather (Frank Kelly) takes her to the girls' orphanage and explains to her that rays of light created by the sun shining in a specific spot through the clouds are called "angel rays"; they indicate that a guardian angel is watching over her. Evelyn finds when she enters the orphanage that conditions are harsh and many of the girls have been there for years.

Desmond finds little hope in regaining custody of his children because he cannot afford a lawyer, turns to drink, and assaults Father O'Malley—who punches him back. Desmond is helped by the local part-time bartender and chemist, Bernadette (Julianna Margulies), who tells him to see her brother Michael (Stephen Rea), a solicitor. He makes it clear to Desmond that he cannot help him until he gets his act together—regular income and orderly life. Desmond finds decorating jobs and spends nights singing for tips with his father in the pub where Bernadette works.

Desmond gets a letter from Evelyn that says she hasn't been adjusting well and that Sister Brigid (Andrea Irvine) beat her when she questioned the Sister's authority; the Sister had beaten another student when she forgot Bible Scripture, although it stated that "God is merciful" therefore God would not want Sister Brigid to beat the children for forgetting Scripture. While seeking out Evelyn, he finds and shakes the Sister while threatening to "tear her limb from limb" should she ever touch his daughter again.

Desmond returns to drink, and after several rampages Bernadette refuses to continue her relationship with him until he shapes up; Desmond reforms. The American Nick Barron (Aidan Quinn), and the injured rugby player and rebel lawyer Thomas Connolly (Alan Bates) argue Desmond's court plea for regaining custody of his children; it is rejected by the courts leading Desmond and his children heartbroken and separated. But that night, the same night Desmond quits drinking, a gambler rigs Desmond to win copious amounts of money to pay his legal bills. But with nowhere to go, the case seems hopeless until Connolly proposes bringing an entirely new issue to the Supreme Court: that the lack of children's custody by a parent is contrary to the Irish Constitution—an issue never successfully argued before the Court.

It takes public pressure for the case to be heard before the Court. Desmond gives compelling testimony. The following day, Evelyn says in court that she told a false story about her bruised face because Sister Brigid exaggerated her interaction with Desmond. Evelyn works herself into a pickle when angel rays come into the court through the windows—a sign to her that her grandfather was watching over her. She recants her newly-expressed explanation with comebacks that make people chuckle. She concludes with a recitation of a prayer asking to forgive Sister Brigid and ensure the prospering of Ireland and its people. Two of the three judges side with Desmond, the children are returned to him, and he falls in love with Bernadette. They are shown on Christmas Day, celebrating as a family.

Historical accuracy
Survivors of the industrial schools have criticised the claim in the credits of the film that changes in Irish law resulting from the case led to children being reunited with their families.

Cast

 Pierce Brosnan as Desmond Doyle
 Julianna Margulies as Bernadette Beattie
 Frank Kelly as Henry Doyle
 Stephen Rea as Michael Beattie
 Aidan Quinn as Nick Barron
 Alan Bates as Tom Connolly
 Sophie Vavasseur as Evelyn Doyle
 Bosco Hogan as Father O'Malley
 Mark Lambert as Minister of Education
 John Lynch as Senior Counsel Mr. Wolfe

Production
Ardmore Studios, and Castleknock College were used as filming locations.

Reception
On Rotten Tomatoes the film has an approval rating of 64% based on reviews from 114 critics. On Metacritic the film has a score of 55% based on reviews from 30 critics.

References

External links
 
 Children Act, 1941
 

2002 films
Drama films based on actual events
Films set in Dublin (city)
English-language Irish films
Films shot in the Republic of Ireland
Films directed by Bruce Beresford
2002 drama films
United Artists films
Films about father–daughter relationships
2000s English-language films